Ankylosphenodon is an extinct species of sphenodontian known from Tepexi de Rodriguez, Mexico. It is known from Early Cretaceous sedimentary deposits from the Tlayua formation.

Lifestyle
Ankylosphenodon is thought to have been an aquatic reptile due to its pachyostotic skeleton and other anatomical features often seen in aquatic animals. There is also evidence that its teeth were constantly growing throughout its lifetime, which may be indicative of herbivory, a rare characteristic among Lepidosauria.

References

Sphenodontia
Cretaceous reptiles of North America
Prehistoric reptile genera